John L. Cinicola Jr. (August 14, 1929 – August 14, 2014) was an American high school and college basketball coach.  He was head coach of his alma mater, Duquesne University, where he led the Dukes to the 1977 NCAA Tournament behind star guard Norm Nixon.  His overall record at Duquesne was 52–56 in four seasons.

Cinicola died of cancer on August 14, 2014 in his home in Bellevue, Pennsylvania.

References

1929 births
2014 deaths
Basketball coaches from Pennsylvania
College men's basketball head coaches in the United States
Duquesne Dukes men's basketball coaches
Duquesne University alumni
High school basketball coaches in the United States
People from Bellevue, Pennsylvania